Dia , also known as Jupiter LIII, is a prograde irregular satellite of Jupiter. Provisionally known as S/2000 J 11, it received its name on March 7, 2015. It is named after Dia, daughter of Deioneus (or Eioneus), wife of Ixion. According to Homer, she was seduced by Zeus in stallion form; Pirithous was the issue.

The satellite is one of several known small bodies in the Himalia group.

Dia is thought to be about 4 kilometres in diameter. It orbits Jupiter at an average distance of 12 million km in 274 days, at an inclination of 28° (to Jupiter's equator), and with an eccentricity of 0.21.

Observational history

Dia was discovered by a team of astronomers from the University of Hawaii led by Scott S. Sheppard in 2000 with an observation arc of 26 days.

Initial observations were not followed up, and Dia was not observed for more than a decade after 2000. This apparent disappearance led some astronomers to consider the moon lost. One theory was that it had crashed into Himalia, creating a faint ring around Jupiter. However, it was finally recovered in observations made in 2010 and 2011.

References

External links
Natural Satellites Ephemeris Service Minor Planet Center
Planetary Satellite Mean Orbital Parameters NASA JPL
Scott Sheppard pages
David Jewitt pages

Himalia group
Moons of Jupiter
Irregular satellites
Discoveries by Scott S. Sheppard
Discoveries by David C. Jewitt
Discoveries by Yanga R. Fernandez
Discoveries by Eugene A. Magnier
20001205
Moons with a prograde orbit